Neku may refer to:

 Neku language, an Oceanic language of New Caledonia.
 Neku can also refer to sisters who are busy doing nekami all the time.
 Neku Sakuraba, a fictional character in The World Ends With You
 Neku Siyar (1671–1723), claimant to the throne of India
 Neku Atawodi (b. 1987), Nigerian polo player
 Hemistomia neku, a species of freshwater snail